Caroline Mohr Sunshine (born September 5, 1995) is an American former actress who previously worked as a White House staffer.

As an actress, she is best known for her co-starring role as flashy, rude European exchange student Tinka Hessenheffer on the Disney Channel series Shake It Up. Sunshine has also appeared in the feature film Marmaduke (2010), the documentary Behind The Scenes (2012), and the direct-to-video film The Outfield (2015).

Early life
Caroline Sunshine was born on September 5, 1995, in Atlanta, Georgia, to parents Thom and Karen Sunshine.  She was raised in Orange County, California, and has two younger brothers, Johnny and Christopher.  Sunshine began studying ballet at the age of 3 and landed her first lead role playing Goldilocks in a kindergarten play. She later moved on to acting with the Orange County Children's Theater and dancing competitively with the South Coast Performing Arts studio in Tustin, California.

Career

Acting

In 2004 Sunshine started in theater and her stage credits include Annie Warbucks at the Orange County Children's Theatre, The Nutcracker at the Academy of Dance and South Coast Performing Arts, and Stage Door at the Lutheran High School of Orange County. In 2006, Sunshine began going to professional auditions at the age of 11, and landed her first role in a commercial for Amazing Allysen the talking doll, as well as commercial work for Yoplait Go-Gurt, and Cap'n Crunch.  In 2010, Sunshine filmed her first pilot for the CBS sitcom, Team Spitz, co-starring as the teenage daughter of a high school coach played by Rob Riggle.  In the summer of that same year, she gained popular notoriety for her role as Barbara Winslow in her first feature film, Marmaduke, based on the comic strip of the same name.

In the fall of 2010, Sunshine landed what would become her most famous role as a co-star on the Disney Channel original series, Shake It Up  as European exchange student, Tinka Hessenheffer alongside Kenton Duty as her flamboyant twin brother, Gunther Hessenheffer.  The glitzy brother/sister duo of Gunther and Tinka is said to be inspired by Ryan and Sharpay Evans of Disney's High School Musical franchise. She was a recurring cast member during the first season, but was promoted to a regular character for the second and third seasons. The series ended in November 2013.  Sunshine appeared on the Disney Channel Christmas album Holidays Unwrapped; her cover version of "All I Want for Christmas Is You" was featured as the tenth song on the album.

In June 2014 she filmed a Freeform pilot called Recovery Road based on  Blake Nelson's novel of the same name, in which she plays a title role alongside Samantha Logan. Neither Sunshine nor Logan would appear in the actual series, however. Logan was replaced by Jessica Sula and Sunshine's character was removed from the script. During 2015 Sunshine appeared in a TV Movie called Go Four Broke as Tiffani Brand. And earlier she appeared in the big screen production of The Outfield.

Activism 
In February 2011, Sunshine became the spokesmodel for the teen fragrance, "Puppy Love 4 Girlz". "Puppy Love" Fragrances is committed to helping homeless dogs and puppies, with a portion of all proceeds of the perfume going to local animal shelters. In May 2011, Sunshine was named one of Dream Magazine's "Top 16 Under 16".

In addition to her work with "Puppy Love", Sunshine is involved in several other charitable causes including the "Joyful Sewing Organization," which makes blankets for cancer patients, "Working Wardrobes," which provides assistance to underprivileged women and victims of domestic abuse, the Orange County Child Abuse Prevention Center, which offers in-home parenting classes to families to break the generational cycle of abuse, the "Adopt A Hero" program, which provides for the needs of soldiers and their families; the "Loaves and Fishes Ministry" which helps to feed the homeless, and the "Thirst Project," which is dedicated to providing clean drinking water to communities in developing nations.

Politics
Sunshine got involved in politics as a White House intern during the Trump Administration in January 2018, receiving a full-time job as a press assistant by mid-March 2018. Prior to this role, Sunshine had interned for the office of Kevin McCarthy, then the House Majority Leader; the College Republican National Committee; and the California Republican Party. In February 2023, Sunshine became the press secretary and communications director for Eric Doden, a gubernatorial candidate for Indiana governor.

Personal life
Sunshine began dating Matt Stumme in 2013; the pair went to high school and college together. Sunshine is a graduate of Claremont McKenna College in Claremont, California, and Orange Lutheran High School in Orange, California.

Filmography

Stage

Discography

Promotional singles

Other appearances

Awards and nominations

References

External links

 
  

1995 births
21st-century American actresses
Actors from Orange County, California
Actresses from Atlanta
Actresses from California
American child actresses
American film actresses
American television actresses
California Republicans
Claremont McKenna College alumni
Georgia (U.S. state) Republicans
Living people
Trump administration personnel